Robert D. "Rob" Wilkey (born December 12, 1956) was a Democratic member of the Kentucky House of Representatives, representing the 22nd District since 1996. He served as Majority Whip.

Birth
Robert Wilkey was born on December 12, 1956.

Religion
Robert Wilkey is Presbyterian.

Family
Robert Wilkey is married to Terry, and together they have two children named Grace and Seth.

Education
Wilkey received his education from the following institutions:
JD, University of Louisville
BA, University of Kentucky

Political Experience
Wilkey has had the following political experience:
Majority Whip, Kentucky House of Representatives, 2007-2008
Representative, Kentucky House of Representatives, 1996-2008

Organizations
Wikey has been a member of the following organizations:
Board Member, Chamber of Commerce
Chair, Ducks Unlimited
Former President, Franklin-Simpson Chamber of Commerce
Member, Kentucky Bar Association
Former President, Optimist Club
Elder, Bowling Green Presbyterian Church

External links
Kentucky Legislature - Representative Rob Wilkey official government site
Project Vote Smart - Representative Robert D. 'Rob' Wilkey (KY) profile
Follow the Money - Rob Wilkey
2008 2006 2004 2002 2000 1998 1996 campaign contributions
KentuckyVotes.org - Rep. Rob Wilkey bills introduced and voting record

References

Members of the Kentucky House of Representatives
1956 births
Living people